St Peter's Italian Church is a Roman Catholic basilica-style church located in Saffron Hill on Clerkenwell Road, Holborn, London. It lies just within the boundaries of the London Borough of Camden, but is particularly associated with the Italian community of Clerkenwell ("Little Italy"), whose hub lies within the London Borough of Islington.

History
The church was built at the request of Saint Vincent Pallotti, and remains under the control of the Pallottines, the religious society which he founded. He had assistance from the politician and activist Giuseppe Mazzini, who was in London at the time. It was intended for the use of the growing number of Italian immigrants in London in the mid-19th century, and was modelled by Irish architect Sir John Miller-Bryson on the Basilica San Crisogono in Rome.

It was consecrated on 16 April 1863 as "The Church of St Peter of all Nations". At the time of consecration, it was the only basilica-style church in the UK. Its organ was built in 1886 by Belgian Anneesen.

During World War II, when Italian immigrants were interned, Irish Pallottines made use of the church. In 1953 it was returned to Italian control, since when it has been substantially remodelled, most notably in 1996.

The church has been the main gathering and reunion venue for the community of Little Italy in Clerkenwell, and is a central feature of the annual processione held in mid-July.

Architecture
The frontal section of the church consists of a loggia and portico with twin arches, above which are three alcoves. The central alcove contains a statue of Christ, whilst the sides contain statues of St Bede and St George. Between the alcoves are two large mosaics depicting the miracle of the fishes and Jesus giving the keys of the Kingdom of Heaven to St Peter.

In the loggia are two wall memorials: one, installed in 1927, to veterans (mostly Italian Britons) of World War I; and the other, installed in 1960, to 446 Italians who lost their lives on the SS Arandora Star in 1940.

Above the façade is a 33-metre-high bell tower, built in 1891, which houses a bell known as "The Steel Monster".

Parish priests
 Father Roberto Russo (1975–1991)
 Father Carmello di Giovanni (1991–2014)
 Father Andrea Fulco (2014– )

Assistant priests
 Father Carmello di Giovanni (1970–1991)
 Father Roberto Russo (1991–2001)
 Father Ryszard Wrobel (2002–2019)
 Father Andrea Fulco (2003-2007)
 Father Giuseppe di Caro (2014– )

See also
 Accademia Apulia
 Italians in the United Kingdom
 Catholicism in England

References

Further reading

External links

 
 

Italian diaspora in the United Kingdom
Roman Catholic churches in the London Borough of Camden
Churches completed in 1863
1863 establishments in the United Kingdom
19th-century Roman Catholic church buildings in the United Kingdom
Buildings and structures in Clerkenwell
Churches in the Roman Catholic Diocese of Westminster